During the 2006–07 German football season, FC Schalke 04 competed in the Bundesliga.

Season summary
Schalke finished 2nd, two points behind champions Stuttgart.

First-team squad
Squad at end of season

Left club during season

Transfers

In
 Gustavo Franchin Schiavolin - Paraná, January

Out
 Christian Poulsen - released, June

Competitions

Bundesliga

League table

Matches 
 Schalke 04 3-1 Borussia Dortmund

References

Notes

FC Schalke 04 seasons
FC Schalke 04